Tiburtius  Tiburce;  Tiburcio,  Tyburcjusz, Tyburcy) can refer to:
Saint Tiburtius
Tiburtius, Valerian, and Maximus
Tiburtius Rosd, Hungarian nobleman
Franziska Tiburtius (1843–1927), pioneering German woman doctor

See also
Tibor, European name related to Tiburtius